In chemistry, persulfide refers to the functional group R-S-S-H.  Persulfides are intermediates in the biosynthesis of iron-sulfur proteins and are invoked as precursors to hydrogen sulfide, a signaling molecule.

Nomenclature
The nomenclature used for organosulfur compounds is often non-systematic.  Sometimes persulfides are called hydrodisulfides to further avoid confusion with disulfides with the grouping R-S-S-R, by emphasizing the presence of an H at one end of a disulfide bond.

Properties
Compared to thiols (R-S-H), persulfides are uncommon.  They are thermodynamically unstable with respect to loss of elemental sulfur:
RSSH → RSH + 1/8 S8
Nonetheless, persulfides are often kinetically stable.

The S-H bond is both more acidic and more fragile than in thiols. This can be seen in the bond dissociation energy of a typical persulfide, which is 22 kcal/mol weaker than a typical thiol, and the lower pKa of about 6.2 for persulfides compared to 7.5 for thiols. Thus, persulfides exist predominantly in the ionized form at neutral pH. This effect is attributed to the stability of the RSS· radical.

Structure and reactions
The structure of trityl persulfide has been determined by X-ray crystallography.  The S-S bond length is 204 picometers and the C-S-S-H dihedral angle is 82°. These parameters are unexceptional.  (C6H5)3CSSH behaves as a source of sulfur, illustrated by its reaction with triphenylphosphine to give triphenylphosphine sulfide and triphenylmethanethiol:  
(C6H5)3CSSH  +  P(C6H5)3  →   (C6H5)3CSH  +  SP(C6H5)3

Biosynthetic and catabolic roles
The cofactors 4-thiouridine and thiamine are produced by the action of persulfides.  Cystathionase generates the persulfide of cysteine (sometimes called thiocysteine) from cystine.  

Persulfides have been invoked as intermediates in the biodegradation of carbon disulfide and mercaptopyruvate.

References

Thiols
Functional groups